Josefine Lindstrand is a Swedish singer. She received the Jazz in Sweden award for 2009 from the government agency Rikskonserter, and her debut record There Will Be Stars was released soon afterwards. The album received a favourable review in Svenska Dagbladet.
In 2012 her second album Clouds was released. Lindenstrand used her middle name Britah for this record, which a reviewer in Dagens Nyheter characterised as pop rather than jazz.

Lindstrand has also performed with artists such as Efterklang, Django Bates, Uri Caine, Petra Marklund, Veronica Maggio, Maia Hirasawa, Laleh, and Jonathan Johansson. She resides in Stockholm, Sweden.

Awards
 2004 – The Ted Gärdestad scholarship
 2009 – Rikskonserter's Jazz i Sverige ("Jazz in Sweden")

Discography
 Britah; Clouds, Antfarm Records
 Josefine Lindstrand; There Will Be Stars, Caprice Records

References

External links
 https://web.archive.org/web/20161106235438/http://www.josefinelindstrand.net/

1981 births
Living people
21st-century Swedish singers
Human Chain members